Slovakia competed at the 2016 Winter Youth Olympics in Lillehammer, Norway from 12 to 21 February 2016.

Medalists

Alpine skiing

Boys

Girls

Biathlon

Boys

Girls

Mixed

Bobsleigh

Cross-country skiing

Boys

Girls

Figure skating

Singles

Mixed NOC team trophy

Ice hockey

Girls' tournament

Roster

 Patricia Agostonova
 Paula Caganova
 Alexandra Cornakova
 Michaela Hajnikova
 Kinga Horvathova
 Klaudia Kleinova
 Barbora Koysova
 Livia Kubekova
 Nina Kucerkova
 Simona Lezovicova
 Zuzana Majerikova
 Sylvia Matasova
 Andrea Risianova
 Nikola Rumanova
 Dominika Sedlakova
 Laura Sulikova
 Diana Vargova

Group Stage

Semifinals

Bronze medal game

Luge

Individual sleds

Mixed team relay

See also
Slovakia at the 2016 Summer Olympics

References

2016 in Slovak sport
Nations at the 2016 Winter Youth Olympics
Slovakia at the Youth Olympics